The calcaneal nerve branches refer to:
Medial calcaneal branches of the tibial nerve
Lateral calcaneal branches of sural nerve